Hazmat Class 1 are explosive materials which are any substance or article, including a device, which is designed to function by explosion or which, by chemical reaction within itself is able to function in a similar manner even if not designed to function by explosion.

Class 1 consists of six 'divisions', that describes the potential hazard posed by the explosive. The division number is the second number after the decimal point on a placard.
The classification has an additional layer, of categorization, known as 'compatibility groups', which breaks explosives in the same division into one of 13 groups, identified by a letter, which is used to separate incompatible explosives from each other. This letter also appears on the placard, following the number.

The movement of class 1 materials is tightly regulated, especially for divisions 1.1 and 1.2, which represent some of the most dangerous explosives, with the greatest potential for destruction and loss of life. Regulations in the United States require drivers have and follow a pre-prepared route, not park the vehicle within  of bridges, tunnels, a fire, or crowded places. The vehicle must be attended to by its driver at all times while its parked. Drivers are also required to carry the following paperwork and keep it in an accessible and easy to locate location: written emergency instructions, written route plan, a copy of Federal Motor Carrier Safety Regulations, Part 397 - Transport of Hazardous Materials; driving and parking rules.  Some tunnels and bridges severely restrict or completely forbid vehicles carrying Class 1 cargoes.

Divisions

Placards

Compatibility table

Transportation segregation table

Compatibility group table

See also
 Dangerous goods
 Explosive
 Hazardous material

Notes

References

Hazardous materials